Bernard Accoyer (born 12 August 1945 in Lyon) is a French politician who was President of the National Assembly of France from 2007 to 2012. He was also the Mayor of Annecy-le-Vieux.

Biography
Accoyer, a doctor by profession, has served as Mayor of Annecy-le-Vieux since March 1989; he also served as a member of the General Council of Haute-Savoie from March 1992 to March 1998. He is a deputy for the first constituency of Haute-Savoie and was first elected to the National Assembly in the March 1993 parliamentary election; he has been re-elected in each election since. He was President of the Union for a Popular Movement (UMP) group in the National Assembly of France from 2004 to 2007.

In 2007, he was selected as the candidate of the UMP group, which has the absolute majority, for the presidency of the National Assembly. He became the President of the National Assembly on 26 June 2007.

Despite the unwritten tradition that the President of the National Assembly abstains from taking part in votes, Accoyer voted in favor of a bill providing for major constitutional changes on 21 July 2008; because the bill passed by only a one-vote margin, his vote in favor, along with that of Socialist deputy Jack Lang, was crucial.

References

|-

1945 births
Living people
Politicians from Lyon
University of Lyon alumni
Rally for the Republic politicians
The Republicans (France) politicians
The Strong Right
Gaullism, a way forward for France
Mayors of places in Auvergne-Rhône-Alpes
Presidents of the National Assembly (France)
Deputies of the 12th National Assembly of the French Fifth Republic
Deputies of the 13th National Assembly of the French Fifth Republic
Deputies of the 14th National Assembly of the French Fifth Republic
20th-century French physicians
Officiers of the Légion d'honneur
People from Annecy
Physicians from Lyon